TIBCO Spotfire is an artificial intelligence (AI)-based analytics platform. Before being acquired by TIBCO in 2007, Spotfire was a business intelligence company based in Somerville, Massachusetts.

History
Spotfire was founded by Christopher Ahlberg and Ben Shneiderman to develop applications of dynamic queries in the early 1990s. 

Ahlberg returned to Sweden and developed an enhanced UNIX implementation of his visual data analysis tool, the Information Visualization and Exploration Environment (IVEE). 

Spotfire was launched in mid-1996 by IVEE Development, which was renamed Spotfire Inc.

TIBCO bought the company in 2007 for $190 million. In November 2011, TIBCO added business intelligence (BI) and analytics software Spotfire 4.0 with Microsoft SharePoint integration.

, the latest version is Spotfire X.  Spotfire X incorporates natural language query (NLQ) powered search, AI-driven recommendations, and model-based processing.

See also 
Business intelligence software
Artificial intelligence
Data science
Machine learning

References

External links
Spotfire Overview

Business intelligence companies
Data visualization software